Robert Grenier (born August 4, 1941, in Minneapolis, Minnesota) is a contemporary American poet associated with the Language School. He was founding co-editor (with Barrett Watten) of the influential magazine This (1971–1974). This was a watershed moment in the history of recent American poetry, providing one of the first gatherings in print of various writers, artists, and poets now identified (or loosely referred to) as the Language poets.

He is the co-editor of The Collected Poems of Larry Eigner, Volumes 1-4 published by Stanford University Press in 2010, and was the editor of Robert Creeley's Selected Poems, published in 1976. Grenier's early work, influenced by Creeley, is noted for its minimalism. Grenier's recent work, however, is as much visual as verbal, involving multicolor "drawn" poems in special (and not always reproducible) formats.

Life and work
Robert Grenier is a graduate of Harvard College and the University of Iowa Program in Creative Writing. He has taught literature and creative writing at UC Berkeley, Tufts, Franconia College, New College of California and Mills College.

His works include Sentences, Series, Oakland, A Day At The Beach, Phantom Anthems and OWL/ON/BOU/GH.

In an essay from the first issue of This, Grenier declared: "I HATE SPEECH". Ron Silliman, commenting on Robert Grenier's gesture some years afterward, wrote: 

Grenier's recent "books" have been variously described as folios of haiku-like inscriptions or transcriptions. Examples of his current holograph poems can be seen on-line through the Grenier Author Page at the Electronic Poetry Center (see section below: "External links"). Curtis Faville (who co-edited The Collected Poems of Larry Eigner with Grenier) states that Grenier "has gone on to produce a new hybrid form--neither "poetry" nor graphic art—which treats words (letters) as a form of literal visual design, in which "legibility" hovers at the edge of apprehension". He received the Foundation for Contemporary Arts Grants for Artists award (2013).

Notes

Selected publications

Books of poems
Dusk Road Games (poems, 1960–66). Cambridge, MA: Pym-Randall Press, 1967.
Sentences Towards Birds (41 poems from Sentences). Kensington, CA: L Press, 1975.
Series (poems, 1967–71). San Francisco: This Press, 1978.
Sentences (500 poems on 5" x 8" index cards, boxed, 1972–77). Cambridge, MA Whale Cloth Press, 1978.
CAMBRIDGE M'ASS (265 poems on 40" x 48" poster). Berkeley, CA: Tuumba Press, 1979.
Oakland. Berkeley, CA: Tuumba Press, 1980.
A Day At The Beach. New York: Roof Books, 1985.
Phantom Anthems. Oakland, CA: O Books, 1986.
What I Believe. Elmwood, CT: Potes & Poets Press, 1988.
What I Believe transpiration/transpiring Minnesota (66 8.5" x 11" pages, unbound, boxed). Oakland, CA: O Books, 1991.
12 from r h y m m s (12 4-color 8-1/2" x 11" drawing poems in envelope). Columbus, OH: Pavement Saw Press, 1996.
OWL/ON/BOU/GH (32 4-color 11" x 17" drawing poems in black portfolio). Sausalito, CA: Post-Apollo Press, 1997.
16 from r h y m m s (16 4-color 8-1/2" x 11" drawing poems in envelope). Marfa, TX: Marfa Book Company/Impossible Objects, 2014.

External links
Robert Grenier EPC Author Page at the Electronic Poetry Center (EPC)
Robert Grenier PennSound page
Text Festival Grenier Page relates Grenier's participation on 29 September 2005, in Great Britain
Guide to the Robert Grenier Papers, 1941-1999 located at Department of Special Collections, Green Library, Stanford University Libraries
Ron Silliman on Grenier's minimalism American poet Ron Silliman discusses both Robert Grenier and American poet Aram Saroyan in the context of their minimalism (On Silliman's Blog, May 21, 2007). Scroll down to the comments section for an interesting history of Grenier's various writing periods and publications provided by American poet Curtis Faville
Robert Grenier and Charles Bernstein: A Conversation appearing in the on-line zine: Jacket, No. 35 (2008)
 Larry Eigner Author Page at Stanford University Press The publisher of The Collected Poems of Larry Eigner, Volumes 1-4 offers extensive resources on Eigner's life to include reviews, descriptions, and a pdf file of Grenier's "Introduction"
Robert Grenier by Paul Stephens Bomb
Finding aid to Robert Grenier papers at Columbia University. Rare Book & Manuscript Library.

American male poets
1941 births
Living people
Harvard College alumni
University of Iowa alumni
Language poets
American magazine founders